Mandailing Natal, abbreviated as Madina, is a regency in North Sumatra Province of Indonesia. It covers an area of 6,620.70 square kilometres and it had a population of 403,894 people at the 2010 census and 472,886 at the 2020 Census. The capital lies at Panyabungan. The Regency was a former part of South Tapanuli Regency

Administration
At the 2010 Census, the regency was divided into eighteen districts (kecamatan). Subsequently, five additional districts (indicated by asterisks in the table below) have been created by the division of existing districts. The twenty-three districts are tabulated below with their areas and their population at the 2010 Census  and the 2020 Census The table also includes the locations of the district administrative centres, the number of administrative villages (desa and kelurahan) in each district and its post code.

National Park 

 see Batang Gadis National Park

References 

Regencies of North Sumatra